Monopeltis infuscata, also known commonly as the dusky spade-snouted worm lizard, the dusky worm lizard, and the infuscate wedge-snouted amphisbaenian, is a species of amphisbaenian in the family Amphisbaenidae. The species is indigenous to southern Africa.

Geographic range
M. infuscata is found in Angola, Botswana, Namibia, South Africa, and Zimbabwe.

Habitat

Description
M. infuscata is pinkish, both dorsally and ventrally.

Reproduction
M. infuscata is viviparous. The adult female gives birth to a small brood in summer.

References

Further reading
Broadley DG (1997). "A review of the Monopeltis capensis complex in southern Africa (Reptilia: Amphisbaenidae)". African Journal of Herpetology 46 (1): 1–12. (Monopeltis infuscata, new species).
Gans C (2005). "Checklist and Bibliography of the Amphisbaenia of the World". Bulletin of the American Museum of Natural History (289): 1–130. (Monopeltis infuscata, p. 36).

Monopeltis
Reptiles of Angola
Reptiles of Botswana
Reptiles of Namibia
Reptiles of South Africa
Reptiles of Zimbabwe
Reptiles described in 1997
Taxa named by Donald George Broadley